Hajjiabad Base ( – Khāneh Hāy Sāzmānī Pādegān-e Ḩājjīābād) is a village/military base in Dorudfaraman Rural District, in the Central District of Kermanshah County, Kermanshah Province, Iran. At the 2006 census, its population was 903, in 218 families.

References 

Populated places in Kermanshah County
Military installations of Iran